Kerala State Road Transport Corporation SWIFT (KSRTC SWIFT), also known as K-SWIFT, is an transport company formed for operating long-distance buses of Kerala State Road Transport Corporation (KSRTC). The company was formed on 9 November 2021 with an aim to overcome the financial crisis faced by the KSRTC. K-SWIFT functions independently within the KSRTC and the company will be dissolved and the assets  merged with the KSRTC in 2031.

History
KSRTC SWIFT was formed on 9 November 2021. The government set up five temporary posts of senior managers in the newly formed company. Also, KSRTC CMD was entrusted with the task of cooperating with the company.

References 

Bus companies of India
Transport in Kerala
State agencies of Kerala
Companies based in Thiruvananthapuram
Transport companies established in 2021
Indian companies established in 2021